Mukut Manikya was briefly the ruler of Tripura during the late 15th century.

Mukut gained the throne following the brief reigns of Pratap Manikya and Vijaya Manikya I, who were likely his elder brother and paternal nephew respectively. It is possible that his ascension was ensured through backing of military leaders, whose influence had waxed during the reigns of his immediate predecessors. Numismatic evidence indicates that this occurred in 1489.

However, Mukut's own rule was very short, with the coinage produced the very next year (i.e. 1490) instead displaying the name of his brother Dhanya Manikya. It may be that he had lost the favour of the chiefs, who subsequently had him overthrown.

References

Kings of Tripura
History of Tripura